Cacia arisana is a species of beetle in the family Cerambycidae. It was described by Kano in 1933. It is known from Taiwan.

References

Cacia (beetle)
Beetles described in 1933